Manota is a genus of flies belonging to the family Mycetophilidae.

The genus has cosmopolitan distribution.

Species
Manota abakiga Hippa & Kurina, 2012
Manota abbreviata Kurina, Hippa & Amorim, 2018
Manota acehensis Hippa & Ševcík, 2010
Manota aconcinna Hippa, 2007
Manota aconcinna Hippa, 2008
Manota acris Kurina & Hippa, 2015
Manota aculifera Hippa & Kurina, 2012
Manota acuminata Jaschhof & Hippa, 2005
Manota acutangula Hippa, 2006
Manota acutistylus Jaschhof & Hippa, 2005
Manota adunca Hippa & Saigusa, 2016
Manota afra Hippa & Kurina, 2012
Manota aligera Hippa, Kurina & Sääksjärvi, 2017
Manota alulata Kurina & Hippa, 2015
Manota anafracta Hippa & Kurina, 2013
Manota anceps Hippa & Ševcík, 2010
Manota ancylochaeta Hippa, 2007
Manota ancylochaeta Hippa, 2008
Manota angustata Hippa, 2006
Manota apentachaeta Kurina & Hippa, 2015
Manota appendiculata Hippa & Kurina, 2013
Manota aquila Hippa, 2011
Manota arenalensis Jaschhof & Hippa, 2005
Manota aristata Hippa & Kurina, 2013
Manota aristoseta Hippa, Kurina & Sääksjärvi, 2017
Manota atlantica Kurina, Hippa & Amorim, 2018
Manota aureonigra Matile, 1979
Manota auriculata Hippa, 2007
Manota auriculata Hippa, 2008
Manota avita Hippa, 2009
Manota belalongensis Ševcík, Hippa & Wahab, 2014
Manota bicuspis Hippa, 2007
Manota bifida Hippa & Papp, 2007
Manota bihamata Jaschhof & Hippa, 2005
Manota biloba Hippa, 2006
Manota bilobata Papp, 2004
Manota birgitae Jaschhof & Jaschhof, 2010
Manota bisulca Hippa & Kurina, 2013
Manota biunculata Hippa, 2007
Manota bracteata Hippa & Kurina, 2012
Manota bruneiensis Hippa & Ševcík, 2010
Manota burundiensis Hippa, Søli & Kurina, 2019
Manota calcarata Hippa, 2006
Manota calva Hippa, Kurina & Sääksjärvi, 2017
Manota capillata Hippa & Ševcík, 2010
Manota caribica Jaschhof & Hippa, 2005
Manota carioca Kurina, Hippa & Amorim, 2018
Manota cavata Kurina, Hippa & Amorim, 2018
Manota cerciflex Hippa, 2006
Manota chelapex Hippa, 2009
Manota chi Hippa, 2009
Manota chinensis Ševcik, 2002
Manota ciliata Hippa, Kurina & Sääksjärvi, 2017
Manota clausa Hippa, 2006
Manota clava Kurina, Hippa & Amorim, 2017
Manota clavulosa Hippa, 2007
Manota clavulosa Hippa, 2008
Manota clinochaeta Hippa, 2008
Manota clinochaeta Hippa, 2008
Manota clivicola Kurina & Hippa, 2015
Manota clurina Hippa & Kurina, 2012
Manota collina Hippa, 2007
Manota collina Hippa, 2008
Manota comata Hippa & Kurina, 2012
Manota concolor Statz, 1944
Manota confixa Hippa, 2007
Manota confixa Hippa, 2008
Manota corcovado Jaschhof & Hippa, 2005
Manota cordata Kurina & Hippa, 2015
Manota cornicula Kurina & Hippa, 2021
Manota cornuta Hippa, Søli & Kurina, 2019
Manota costaricensis Jaschhof & Hippa, 2005
Manota crassiseta Matile, 1979
Manota crinita Hippa, 2007
Manota crinita Hippa, 2008
Manota cristata Hippa, 2007
Manota cristata Hippa, 2008
Manota ctenophora Matile, 1993
Manota cultigera Hippa, 2008
Manota cultrigera Hippa, 2008
Manota curvata Hippa, 2006
Manota curvistylus Hippa, Kjaerandsen & Saigusa, 2011
Manota defecta Williston, 1896
Manota delyorum Papp, 2004
Manota dentata Hippa & Papp, 2007
Manota depilis Hippa & Kurina, 2013
Manota digitata Hippa, Kurina & Sääksjärvi, 2017
Manota dissaidens Hippa & Kurina, 2012
Manota diversiseta Jaschhof & Hippa, 2005
Manota dolichothrix Hippa & Ševcík, 2010
Manota duplex Hippa, 2006
Manota edentula Hippa, 2008
Manota edentula Hippa, 2008
Manota ephippiata Hippa, 2008
Manota epigrata Hippa, 2009
Manota evexa Hippa, 2007
Manota exigua Hippa, Kurina & Sääksjärvi, 2017
Manota eximia Jaschhof & Hippa, 2005
Manota explicans Hippa, 2007
Manota falcata Hippa, 2011
Manota feminea Kurina & Hippa, 2015
Manota fera Hippa, 2006
Manota ferrata Hippa, 2006
Manota fimbriata Hippa, 2007
Manota fimbriata Hippa, 2008
Manota flabellata Hippa, Kurina & Sääksjärvi, 2017
Manota flammula Hippa, 2011
Manota foliolata Hippa & Kurina, 2012
Manota forceps Hippa & Papp, 2007
Manota fraterna Jaschhof & Hippa, 2005
Manota freerki Hippa & Kurina, 2012
Manota furcata Søli, 1993
Manota fusca Matile, 1972
Manota fuscinula Hippa, Søli & Kurina, 2019
Manota gemella Hippa, 2007
Manota geniculata Hippa, Søli & Kurina, 2019
Manota ghanaensis Hippa & Kurina, 2012
Manota globigera Hippa, 2006
Manota granvillensis Jaschhof & Jaschhof, 2010
Manota grootaerti Kurina & Hippa, 2014
Manota hanulata Colless, 1966
Manota heptacantha Hippa, 2006
Manota hexacantha Hippa & Ševcík, 2010
Manota hidalgoensis Hippa & Huerta, 2009
Manota hirsuta Hippa, 2007
Manota hirta Kurina, Hippa & Amorim, 2018
Manota horrida Hippa, 2006
Manota hyboloma Hippa & Ševcík, 2010
Manota ibanezi Hippa & Huerta, 2009
Manota incilis Hippa & Saigusa, 2016
Manota incisa Jaschhof & Hippa, 2005
Manota indahae Hippa & Kjaerandsen, 2010
Manota index Hippa, 2007
Manota index Hippa, 2008
Manota inermis Hippa & Kurina, 2013
Manota inflata Hippa, 2007
Manota inflata Hippa, 2008
Manota inornata Jaschhof & Hippa, 2005
Manota integra Hippa & Saigusa, 2016
Manota intermedia Jaschhof & Hippa, 2005
Manota inusitata Hippa & Papp, 2007
Manota iota Hippa & Kurina, 2013
Manota iquitosensis Hippa, Kurina & Sääksjärvi, 2017
Manota issongo Matile, 1972
Manota joerni Søli, 1993
Manota juncta Hippa, 2007
Manota juncta Hippa, 2008
Manota kaindiensis Kurina & Hippa, 2015
Manota kaspraki Ševcík, Hippa & Wahab, 2014
Manota katusabei Hippa & Kurina, 2012
Manota kerri Kurina, Hippa & Amorim, 2019
Manota kilbaleensis Hippa & Kurina, 2012
Manota kirkspriggsi Hippa, Søli & Kurina, 2019
Manota kyushuensis Hippa, Kjaerandsen & Saigusa, 2011
Manota lachaisei Matile, 1972
Manota lamasi Kurina, Hippa & Amorim, 2018
Manota lanesi Kurina, Hippa & Amorim, 2018
Manota leptochaeta Hippa, Søli & Kurina, 2019
Manota limai Hippa, Søli & Kurina, 2019
Manota limonensis Jaschhof & Hippa, 2005
Manota limulata Hippa, Kurina & Sääksjärvi, 2017
Manota lunata Kurina & Hippa, 2015
Manota mabokeensis Matile, 1972
Manota macrodon Hippa, 2008
Manota macrodon Hippa, 2008
Manota macrothrix Ševcík, Hippa & Wahab, 2014
Manota major Jaschhof & Hippa, 2005
Manota maorica Edwards, 1927
Manota mazumbaiensis Søli, 1993
Manota megachaeta Ševcík, Hippa & Wahab, 2014
Manota meilingae Papp, 2004
Manota mexicapan Hippa & Huerta, 2009
Manota micella Hippa, Kurina & Sääksjärvi, 2017
Manota micula Hippa & Kurina, 2013
Manota minutula Hippa, Kurina & Sääksjärvi, 2017
Manota mirifica Hippa & Papp, 2007
Manota mitrata Hippa & Saigusa, 2016
Manota montana Søli, 1993
Manota montivaga Jaschhof & Hippa, 2005
Manota multilobata Kurina, Hippa & Amorim, 2017
Manota multisetosa Jaschhof & Hippa, 2005
Manota natalensis Jaschhof & Mostovski, 2006
Manota nepalensis Hippa & Saigusa, 2016
Manota nigra Matile, 1972
Manota nimia Kurina & Hippa, 2015
Manota nordestina Kurina, Hippa & Amorim, 2018
Manota nubicola Hippa & Huerta, 2009
Manota nuda Hippa, Kurina & Sääksjärvi, 2017
Manota oblonga Hippa, 2007
Manota oblonga Hippa, 2008
Manota obtecta Hippa, 2009
Manota occulta Hippa & Papp, 2007
Manota oligochaeta Hippa, 2006
Manota oliveirai Kurina, Hippa & Amorim, 2018
Manota omotoensis Hippa, Kjaerandsen & Saigusa, 2011
Manota orientalis Senior-White, 1922
Manota oronnai Hippa, Søli & Kurina, 2019
Manota orthacantha Hippa, 2007
Manota ovata Hippa, 2006
Manota pacifica Edwards, 1928
Manota palpalis Lane, 1948
Manota panda Hippa & Kurina, 2013
Manota paniculata Kurina, Hippa & Amorim, 2018
Manota papaveroi Kurina, Hippa & Amorim, 2018
Manota papillosa Hippa & Kurina, 2013
Manota pappi Hippa, 2006
Manota parilis Hippa, 2007
Manota parva Jaschhof & Hippa, 2005
Manota parvistylata Hippa, 2007
Manota parvistylata Hippa, 2008
Manota parvula Hippa, Kurina & Sääksjärvi, 2017
Manota patula Hippa & Kurina, 2013
Manota paula Hippa & Kurina, 2013
Manota pauloides Hippa, Kurina & Sääksjärvi, 2017
Manota pectinata Hippa, 2006
Manota pedicillata Hippa & Kurina, 2012
Manota pellii Hippa, 2007
Manota pellii Hippa, 2008
Manota peltata Kurina & Hippa, 2014
Manota peltigera Kurina & Hippa, 2014
Manota penicillata Jaschhof & Hippa, 2005
Manota pentacantha Hippa, 2007
Manota pentachaeta Kurina & Hippa, 2015
Manota perangulata Hippa & Ševcík, 2010
Manota periotoi Kurina, Hippa & Amorim, 2018
Manota perissochaeta Hippa, 2007
Manota perlobata Hippa, 2007
Manota perlobata Hippa, 2008
Manota perparva Kurina, Hippa & Amorim, 2018
Manota perplexa Kurina, Hippa & Amorim, 2017
Manota perpusilla Hippa, 2006
Manota pesudocavata Kurina & Hippa, 2021
Manota petiolata Hippa & Kurina, 2012
Manota phyllochaeta Hippa, 2008
Manota phyllochaeta Hippa, 2008
Manota piliata Ševcík, Hippa & Wahab, 2014
Manota pilosa Hippa & Kurina, 2012
Manota pinnata Hippa & Kurina, 2012
Manota pinnulata Hippa & Kurina, 2012
Manota pisinna Hippa & Kurina, 2013
Manota planilobata Hippa, 2007
Manota planilobata Hippa, 2008
Manota planistylus Jaschhof & Hippa, 2005
Manota platychaeta Hippa, Søli & Kurina, 2019
Manota plusiochaeta Hippa, 2006
Manota pollex Hippa, 2006
Manota polylobata Hippa, Søli & Kurina, 2019
Manota prisca Hippa, 2009
Manota procera Hippa, 2006
Manota pseudoiota Kurina, Hippa & Amorim, 2018
Manota purakaunui Jaschhof & Jaschhof, 2010
Manota pustulosa Hippa, Kurina & Sääksjärvi, 2017
Manota quantilla Hippa & Kurina, 2013
Manota quantula Hippa & Kurina, 2013
Manota radula Hippa & Ševcík, 2010
Manota rara Jaschhof & Hippa, 2005
Manota reclinata Kurina & Hippa, 2014
Manota rectolobata Jaschhof & Hippa, 2005
Manota redunca Hippa & Kurina, 2012
Manota regineae Jaschhof & Jaschhof, 2010
Manota relicina Hippa & Kurina, 2012
Manota ricina Ševcík, Hippa & Wahab, 2014
Manota roslii Hippa, 2006
Manota rostrata Kurina, Hippa & Amorim, 2018
Manota rotundistylus Jaschhof & Hippa, 2005
Manota saepium Matile, 1972
Manota sanctavirginae Kurina, Hippa & Amorim, 2018
Manota satoyamanis Hippa & Kjaerandsen, 2010
Manota secreta Hippa & Papp, 2007
Manota seducta Hippa, 2009
Manota semina Hippa & Kurina, 2012
Manota senta Hippa & Kurina, 2013
Manota senticosa Hippa & Kurina, 2012
Manota serawei Hippa, 2007
Manota sericulata Kurina, Hippa & Amorim, 2018
Manota serrata Søli, 1993
Manota serrulata Hippa, Kurina & Sääksjärvi, 2017
Manota sespinaea Søli, 1993
Manota setilobata Kurina, Hippa & Amorim, 2017
Manota siciliculata Kurina & Hippa, 2015
Manota sicula Hippa, 2007
Manota sigma Kurina & Hippa, 2015
Manota silvai Kurina, Hippa & Amorim, 2018
Manota simplex Hippa, 2006
Manota sinepollex Hippa & Ševcík, 2010
Manota spadix Hippa, 2006
Manota spathula Hippa, 2007
Manota spinosa Jaschhof & Hippa, 2005
Manota squamulata Jaschhof & Hippa, 2005
Manota stricta Hippa & Ševcík, 2010
Manota styloides Søli, 1993
Manota subaristata Kurina, Hippa & Amorim, 2017
Manota subcollina Hippa, 2011
Manota subdentata Hippa, 2007
Manota subdentata Hippa, 2008
Manota subferrata Hippa, 2009
Manota subforceps Hippa & Ševcík, 2010
Manota submirifica Hippa, 2007
Manota submirifica Hippa, 2008
Manota subspathula Hippa, 2007
Manota taedia Matile, 1993
Manota tapantiensis Jaschhof & Hippa, 2005
Manota tavaresi Kurina, Hippa & Amorim, 2018
Manota tayal Hippa & Saigusa, 2016
Manota teocchii Matile, 1972
Manota tetrachaeta Hippa, 2009
Manota toomasi Hippa & Kurina, 2012
Manota toroensis Hippa & Kurina, 2012
Manota transversa Hippa, 2006
Manota tricuspis Hippa, 2007
Manota tridactyla Søli, 1993
Manota tripectinata Hippa, Kjaerandsen & Saigusa, 2011
Manota triseta Hippa, Søli & Kurina, 2019
Manota truuverki Kurina & Hippa, 2021
Manota tunoae Hippa & Kjaerandsen, 2010
Manota ulu Hippa, 2006
Manota uncinata Hippa, 2008
Manota uncinata Hippa, 2008
Manota unifurcata Lundström, 1913
Manota unisetata Kurina & Hippa, 2015
Manota unispinata Kurina, Hippa & Amorim, 2018
Manota usubi Hippa & Kurina, 2012
Manota vesca Hippa & Saigusa, 2016
Manota vesicaria Hippa, 2009
Manota vexillifera Jaschhof & Hippa, 2005
Manota virgata Hippa & Kurina, 2013
Manota vladi Kurina & Hippa, 2021
Manota whiteleyi Jaschhof & Mostovski, 2006
Manota williamsi Kurina, Hippa & Amorim, 2019
Manota wittei Kurina & Hippa, 2014
Manota yaeyamaensis Hippa, Kjaerandsen & Saigusa, 2011
Manota yongi Hippa, 2006

References

Mycetophilidae